The Mixed Grand Lodge of France is a Masonic lodge in France, made up of men and women.  It was first formed in 1982, with the support of the Grand Orient de France (another well-known Masonic lodge), by splitting from the Universal Mixed Grand Lodge (which had itself split from Le Droit Humain).

France
Freemasonry in France
Co-Freemasonry
1982 establishments in France